Simpang Ampat, also known as Simpang Empat, is a small town in the district of South Seberang Perai, in the state of Penang, Malaysia.

It borders Bukit Mertajam town to the north, Junjung town to the east, Sungai Bakap town to the south, and Batu Kawan town to the west.

See also
Batu Kawan
Bukit Tambun
Sungai Bakap

References

South Seberang Perai District
Towns in Penang